Thomas James Macnamara PC (23 August 1861 – 3 December 1931) was a British teacher, educationalist and radical Liberal politician.

Biography
Macnamara was born in Montreal, Quebec, Canada, the son of a soldier originally from County Clare in Ireland. His family returned to Britain in 1869.

He was educated first at the Depot School in Pembroke Dock and then in Exeter. He qualified as a teacher in 1876 at the Borough Road Training College for Teachers.

In 1886, he married Rachel Cameron. They had three sons and one daughter.

Teaching
He was active as a teacher until 1892 in Exeter, Huddersfield and Bristol, when he became editor of The Schoolmaster. He was sometime chairman of the London School Board and in 1896 he was appointed president of the National Union of Teachers.

Politics
In 1900 he was elected to the House of Commons for Camberwell North, a seat he held until 1918, and then represented Camberwell North West until 1924. He served under Sir Henry Campbell-Bannerman as Parliamentary Secretary to the Local Government Board from 1907 to 1908 and under H. H. Asquith and later David Lloyd George as Parliamentary and Financial Secretary to the Admiralty from 1908 to 1920 and was sworn of the Privy Council in 1911. In 1920 Lloyd George appointed him Minister of Labour, with a seat in the cabinet, a position he retained until the government fell in October 1922.

Death
Macnamara died on 3 December 1931, aged 70, of prostate cancer.

Elsie Cameron Elias

His daughter, Elsie Cameron Macnamara was born in 1889. In April 1913 she married Thomas Elias and became known as Elsie Cameron Elias. Her husband was Liberal candidate for Neath in 1923. At the 1924 General Election she stood as Liberal candidate for Southwark South East, finishing third.

Publications

 Schoolmaster sketches – Cassell, 1896
 The Education Bill and its Probable Effects on the Schools, the Scholars and School Teachers – Swan Sonnesschein, 1902
 The Gentle Golfer – Arrowsmith, 1905
 School-Room Humour - Arrowsmith, 1905
 The Education Bill of 1906 Explained and Defended – Liberal Publication Dept. 1906
 School Room Humour – Simpkin, Marshall, Hamilton, 1907
 What Not To Do in H Seton-Karr, Golf – Greening, 1907
 The Political Situation: Letters to Working Men – Hodder and Stoughton, 1909
 Concerning the Navy – Liberal Publication Dept. 1910
 Dr Macnamara's Messages to Working Men – Hodder and Stoughton, 1910
 Let London Lead: The Mother City's Duty to the Empire and Herself – reprinted with additions from the Daily Chronicle, 1910
 The Great Insurance Act: Addresses to Working Men – Hodder and Stoughton, 1912
 The Great Insurance Act: A Year's Experience – Liberal Publication Dept 1913
 Success in Industry – Harrison, 1920
 The Work of the Ministry of Labour – National Liberal Council, 1922
 Labour at the Crossroads: Two Camberwell Addresses – Hodder and Stoughton, 1923
 If Only We Would: Some Reflections on our Social Shortcomings and Some Suggestions for their Removal – P S King, 1926

References

Further reading

Robin Betts, entry in Dictionary of National Biography OUP, 2004–08

External links 
 
 
 

1861 births
1931 deaths
People from Montreal
English educational theorists
English people of Irish descent
Canadian expatriates in England
Liberal Party (UK) MPs for English constituencies
National Union of Teachers-sponsored MPs
Presidents of the National Union of Teachers
UK MPs 1900–1906
UK MPs 1906–1910
UK MPs 1910
UK MPs 1910–1918
UK MPs 1918–1922
UK MPs 1922–1923
UK MPs 1923–1924
Members of the Privy Council of the United Kingdom
Deaths from prostate cancer
Members of the London School Board
National Liberal Party (UK, 1922) politicians
Canadian emigrants to England
Canadian people of Irish descent
Schoolteachers from Devon
Schoolteachers from Yorkshire
Schoolteachers from Bristol